The AN/ALE-55 Fiber-Optic Towed Decoy, or ALE-55, is an RF (Radio Frequency) countermeasure under development by BAE Systems Electronic Solutions for the F/A-18E/F Super Hornet.

Overview 

The ALE-55 is an RF countermeasure designed to protect an aircraft from radar guided missiles. It consists of an aircraft-towed decoy and onboard electronics. It works together with the aircraft's electronic warfare system to provide radar jamming. In addition, it can also be used in a backup mode as a signal repeater, which allows it to lure incoming missiles away from their actual target. It is currently in use with the F/A-18E/F Super Hornet, but can be adapted to a wide variety of platforms with minimal modification.

Defensive Techniques 

The ALE-55 provides three layers of defensive jamming against a radar-based threat: preventing radars from tracking, breaking radar locks, and acting as a target for incoming missiles.

Suppression 

The system detects a threat radar in its acquisition mode and tries to prevent it from locking by using jamming techniques.  The onboard electronic warfare package analyzes the threat, while the towed decoy emits the jamming signals to confuse the tracking radar.

Deflection 

In the case that a radar obtains a lock on the aircraft or decoy system, the electronics on board the aircraft analyze the emissions and then determine the optimum jamming technique to break the radar lock. The jamming is done by the decoy. The ALE-55 also possesses the useful ability to send out multiple jamming frequencies if more than one radar is locked on to the decoy or aircraft.

Seduction 

When a missile launch is detected, indicated by the difference in radar signal and type, the ALE-55 runs a last resort attempt to protect the aircraft towing it.  This last resort is becoming the target, rather than the aircraft, by trying to jam the missile or simulating the aircraft's radar signature.

Components 

The ALE-55 consists of two components. An onboard signal conditioning assembly and fiber optic towed decoys.

The onboard electric frequency converter analyzes radar signals detected by the plane's electronic warfare system and calculates an appropriate jamming and spoofing signal, which is then transmitted to the FOTD through a fiber optic cable.

The towed decoy has dual high power traveling-wave tubes (TWTs) to allow for enough power to protect large aircraft. It is launched with the Raytheon Integrated Multi-Platform Launch Controller (IMPLC), which it shares with the towed ALE-50. A braking system allows for fast deployment.

Operators 

 Australia
Royal Australian Air Force

 United States
United States Navy

 Kingdom of Saudi Arabia
Royal Saudi Air Force

See also
AN/ALE-50

References

External links
www.baesystems.com

Electronic countermeasures
Military electronics of the United States
Military technology
Towed decoys
Weapons countermeasures